Sidney Beckerman (November 26, 1920 – February 25, 2008) was a producer of notable movies including The Adventures of Buckaroo Banzai Across the 8th Dimension, Cabaret, Joe Kidd, Kelly's Heroes, Portnoy's Complaint, Marathon Man, Marlowe, Red Dawn and The Sicilian.

Filmography
He was a producer in all films unless otherwise noted.

Film

Miscellaneous crew

Thanks

References

External links
 

American film producers
1920 births
2008 deaths